Anthony Lucas may refer to:
 Anthony Francis Lucas, Croatian-born American oil explorer
 Anthony T. Lucas, Irish archaeologist, historian and museologist

See also
 Antony J. Lucas, Greek Australian businessman